The Penrhyn by-election was a by-election in the Cook Islands electorate of Penrhyn. It was held on 27 June 2002, and was precipitated by the disqualification of Tepure Tapaitau.

The poll was won by the Cook Islands Party's Wilkie Rasmussen.

References

By-elections in the Cook Islands
2002 elections in Oceania
2002 in the Cook Islands
Penrhyn atoll